

f

fa

fab-fam
fabesetron (INN)
Factive
Factrel
fadolmidine hydrochloride (USAN)
fadrozole (INN)
falecalcitriol (INN)
falimarev (USAN)
falintolol (INN)
falipamil (INN)
famciclovir (INN)
famiraprinium chloride (INN)
Famohexal (Hexal Australia) [Au]. Redirects to famotidine.
famotidine (INN)
famotine (INN)
fampridine (INN)
famprofazone (INN)
Famvir

fan-faz
fananserin (INN)
fandofloxacin (INN)
fandosentan potassium (USAN)
fanetizole (INN)
Fansidar
fantofarone (INN)
fantridone (INN)
faralimomab (INN)
farampator (USAN)
Fareston
Fareston (Orion Corp.)
farletuzumab (USAN, INN)
faropenem (INN)
faropenem medoxomil (USAN)
fasidotril (INN)
fasiplon (INN)
Faslodex
Faslodex (IPR)
fasobegron (INN)
fasoracetam (INN)
Fastin
fasudil (INN)
favipiravir (INN)
faxeladol (USAN, INN)
Fazaclo
fazadinium bromide (INN)
fazarabine (INN)